Twenty Ninth Street is a retail center in Boulder, Colorado (managed by The Macerich Company) that opened on October 13, 2006 on the former site of Crossroads Mall.

The center is separated into three distinct neighborhoods connected by a series of streets, walkways, terraces, plazas and other outdoor community gathering spaces. The center is anchored by Macy's, Home Depot, Century Theaters, Staples, and Colorado Athletic Club.

Description

This district, unlike the mall that preceded it, consists of a collection of small strip malls and big-box stores, separated by streets that carry automobile traffic.  It is not a mall as that term is ordinarily understood. The center is actually considered an open-air "lifestyle center" combining retail, office, entertainment and dining offerings.

History
 From 1979 to 2002, various Crossroads Mall reconstruction ideas were floated and then rejected. Fast-track construction of a Dillard's store was proposed, but vetoed by Foley's (later rebranded to Macy's).
 In June 2002, the owners of Flatiron Crossing Mall (Westcor) merged with the owners of Crossroads Mall (Macerich). 
 On January 23, 2003, the Sears store at Crossroads Mall closed. Plans were submitted to the city to tear down the rest of Crossroads Mall and create a new retail district, dubbed "Twenty Ninth Street". The plans were for about 50-60 shops and a movie theatre. The city agreed, and Macerich/Westcor sprung into action. 
 On January 8, 2004, the closing of Crossroads Mall was announced. The mall closed in February 2004, except for Foley's, which remained in continuous operation.  
 Crossroads Mall was demolished (except for the Mervyn's building, Foley's/Macy's and its adjacent parking structure), and on October 13, 2006, the new Twenty Ninth Street retail district opened.
 A science-based theme was used for official opening with Thomas Dolby performing.
 Macy's announced that it would close its store in January 2022. It is the last store from the original mall.

References

External links 
 Twenty Ninth Street website
 Hyphen discussion

Macerich
Neighborhoods in Boulder, Colorado
Shopping malls in Colorado
Buildings and structures in Boulder, Colorado
Tourist attractions in Boulder, Colorado
Shopping malls established in 2006